Adam & Eve is the eighth studio album by the progressive rock band The Flower Kings. A Japanese edition contained an extra disc which includes the bonus tracks from The Rainmaker bonus disc (the first six tracks), as well as three songs recorded during the Space Revolver sessions.

The album has the only appearance of Pain of Salvation's Daniel Gildenlöw as a full-time band member (he appeared on both Unfold the Future and Meet the Flower Kings as a guest) and is the last album with the drummer Zoltan Csörsz before his first departure (he later appeared on The Sum of No Evil).

Track listing

Personnel
Tomas Bodin – keyboards
Hasse Bruniusson – percussion
Zoltan Csörsz – drums
Hasse Fröberg – vocals, guitars
Daniel Gildenlöw – vocals
Jonas Reingold – bass guitar
Roine Stolt – vocals, guitars, keyboards

References

2004 albums
The Flower Kings albums
Inside Out Music albums